The 1964 Craven Filter Mount Panorama '1500' was a motor race staged at the Mount Panorama Circuit near Bathurst in New South Wales, Australia on 30 March 1964. The race was contested over 13 laps at a total distance of approximately 50 miles.

The race was won by Leo Geoghegan driving a Lotus 27 Ford.

Results

References

Craven Filter Mount Panorama '1500'
Motorsport in Bathurst, New South Wales